Marie Ferdinand-Harris (born October 13, 1978) is an American professional basketball player most recently for the Phoenix Mercury in the Women's National Basketball Association.

Early years
Ferdinand-Harris was born in Miami, Florida, and is of Haitian descent.

High school career
As a senior, Ferdinand averaged 24.0 points, seven rebounds, 5.4 assists, and 2 steals per game, and was named the 1995 Player of the Year in Florida.

College career
Ferdinand attended Louisiana State University and played for the LSU Lady Tigers basketball team. She competed with USA Basketball as a member of the 2000  Jones Cup Team that won the Gold in Taipei.

LSU statistics
Source

WNBA career
Ferdinand was selected by the Utah Starzz 8th overall in the 1st round of the 2001 WNBA Draft.
For her career, Ferdinand averages 13.1 ppg, 3.4 rpg, 2.4 apg, and 1.56 steals per game. She is a two time WNBA All-Star, playing on the 2002 and 2003 teams.

Ferdinand missed the entire 2006 WNBA season after giving birth to her first child.

On February 22, 2008, Ferdinand-Harris signed with the Los Angeles Sparks.

International
 2005–06 Fenerbahçe Istanbul (Turkey)
 Lotos Gdynia (Poland)

Personal
On January 13, 2006, the San Antonio Express-News reported that Ferdinand was expecting a baby boy in June, and was planning to return to the San Antonio Silver Stars by July 2006, preferably after the WNBA All-Star Game.  She and Cedrick Harris, a former player on the LSU Tigers baseball team and former baseball coach (2007–2009) at Antonian College Preparatory High School in San Antonio, met at Louisiana State University and were married on October 8, 2006.

References

External links
WNBA Player Profile
Ferdinand-Harris signed with the Sparks

1978 births
Living people
All-American college women's basketball players
American people of Haitian descent
American women's basketball players
Basketball players from Miami
Fenerbahçe women's basketball players
Phoenix Mercury players
Los Angeles Sparks players
LSU Lady Tigers basketball players
San Antonio Stars players
Shooting guards
Utah Starzz draft picks
Utah Starzz players
Women's National Basketball Association All-Stars